Glyn Jones (born 22 August 1953) is a British former competitive figure skater. He represented Great Britain at the 1976 Winter Olympics in Innsbruck, Austria. He placed 19th in the compulsory figures, 17th in the short program, 16th in the free skate, and 16th overall. He appeared at six ISU Championships, achieving his best result, 13th, at the 1977 Europeans in Helsinki, Finland.

As of August 2011, he was working as a manager at the Tampa Bay Skating Academy in Oldsmar, Florida.

Competitive highlights

References 

1953 births
British male single skaters
Figure skaters at the 1976 Winter Olympics
Living people
Olympic figure skaters of Great Britain
People from Oldsmar, Florida